Coutts is a village in southern Alberta, Canada that is a port of entry into the U.S. state of Montana. It is one of the busiest ports of entry on the Canada–United States border in western Canada. It connects Highway 4 to Interstate 15, an important trade route (CANAMEX Corridor) between Alberta, American states along I-15, and Mexico.

The community has the name of William Burdett-Coutts, a railroad official.

In 2004, a joint border facility opened in Coutts–Sweet Grass, Montana, housing both Canadian and American federal authorities.

History 

In February 2022, four men were arrested on allegations that they conspired to kill Royal Canadian Mounted Police (RCMP) officers. The arrests occurred during the Canada convoy protest in Coutts. According to police, the plot was part of a wider plan to alter "Canada's political, justice and medical systems." In December 2022, Coutts was described by CTV News as a "village divided" as residents identified as supporting or opposing the protest earlier that year.

Demographics 

See also 
List of communities in Alberta

References

External links 

1960 establishments in Alberta
Alberta land ports of entry
County of Warner No. 5
Villages in Alberta